Luxor is an unincorporated community and coal town in Hempfield Township, Westmoreland County, Pennsylvania, United States.

History
The town was established by the Jamison Coal and Coke Company to provide housing for employees of its nearby coal mining complex. Jamison's underground bituminous coal mine, known as Luxor or No. 1 Mine, began operations in the 1890s. Served by the Alexandria branch of the Pennsylvania Railroad, it employed 179 persons by 1897. By 1910 the complex included over 400 coking ovens. In the 1940s the Sekora Coal Company operated a strip mine northeast of the old No. 1 mine. Coal mining in Luxor ended in 1972.

Today
Luxor has its own post office, established in 1894, and zip code (15662). The area covered by this zip code has a population of 271 people.
The mining company store, which has been demolished, stood near where the post office is now located.
The Luxor Volunteer Fire Department closed in March 2021 due to a lack of membership.

Notable people
Mike Sebastian - former halfback in the National Football League and second American Football League
Steve Sundra, former Major League Baseball pitcher and 1939 World Series Champion

Gallery

References

See also
Pennsylvania Mine Map Atlas - Pennsylvania State University.

Unincorporated communities in Pennsylvania
Unincorporated communities in Westmoreland County, Pennsylvania
Pittsburgh metropolitan area
Coal towns in Pennsylvania